The 1988 Soviet First League was the 49th season of the second tier of association football in the Soviet Union.

Teams

Promoted teams
SC Tavriya Simferopol – Winner of the Second League finals (returning after an absence of 3 seasons)
FC Kuban Krasnodar – Winner of the Second League finals (returning after an absence of a season)
FC Zvezda Perm – Winner of the Second League finals (returning after an absence of 8 seasons)

Relegated teams 
CSKA Moscow – (Returning after a season)
FC Guria Lanchkhuti – (Returning after a season)

Locations

League standings

Top scorers

Number of teams by union republic

See also
 Soviet First League

External links
 1988. First League. (1988. Первая лига. ) Luhansk Nash Futbol

Soviet First League seasons
2
Soviet
Soviet